Neora station, station code NEO, is a railway station  in the Danapur railway division of East Central Railway.  Neora is connected to metropolitan areas of India, by the Delhi–Kolkata main line via Mugalsarai–Patna route. Neora is located in Danapur city in Patna district in the Indian state of Bihar. Due to its location on the Howrah–Patna–Mughalsarai main line many Patna, Barauni-bound express trains coming from Howrah, Sealdah stop here.

Facilities 
The major facilities available are waiting rooms, computerized reservation facility and vehicle parking.

Nearest airports 
The nearest airports to Neora station are
Lok Nayak Jayaprakash Airport, Patna 
Gaya Airport

References

External links 
 Official website of the Patna district

Railway stations in Patna district
Danapur railway division